Ajay Singh, also known as Rahul Bhaiya, is an Indian politician from the state of Madhya Pradesh.

He is Ex-Leader of Opposition of Madhya Pradesh Legislative Assembly, also has been elected 5 times from Churhat Vidhan Sabha constituency of Madhya Pradesh Legislative Assembly, having won the general election of 2008. He has also served as a Minister of Madhya Pradesh in the Digvijaya Singh's cabinet.

Singh is the son of Congress leader, former Chief Minister of Madhya Pradesh and former Union Minister of Human Resource Development Shri Kunwar Arjun Singh.

Personal life
He was born in Allahabad, Uttar Pradesh. He is married to Suniti Singh, and is the father of Bollywood actor Arunoday Singh and two daughters.. He is son of former Chief minister of Madhya Pradesh, Arjun Singh. His son Arunoday Singh is an Actor.

Education 
Singh did his schooling from Campion School, Bhopal and graduated from the Shri Ram College of Commerce, Delhi University. He completed his M.A. in Economics from Bhopal University and was a gold medalist.

See also
1998 Madhya Pradesh Legislative Assembly election
Madhya Pradesh Congress Committee

References

External links
 

People from Madhya Pradesh
Living people
Indian National Congress politicians from Madhya Pradesh
Leaders of the Opposition in Madhya Pradesh
People from Sidhi district
Indian National Congress politicians
1955 births